{{DISPLAYTITLE:White Knight (Through the Looking-Glass)}}

The White Knight is a fictional character in Lewis Carroll's 1871 book Through the Looking-Glass. He represents the chess piece of the same name. As imagined in John Tenniel's illustrations for the Alice stories, he is inspired by Albrecht Dürer's 1513 engraving "Knight, Death and the Devil."

 Storyline 
The White Knight saves Alice from his opponent  (the Red Knight). He repeatedly falls off his horse and lands on his head, and tells Alice of his inventions, which consists of things such as a pudding with ingredients like blotting paper, an upside down container, and anklets to guard his horse against shark bites.
He recites a poem of his own composition, 'A-Sitting on a Gate', (but the song's name is called 'Haddocks' Eyes') and he and Alice depart.

 Film incarnations 
 Alice in Wonderland (1933) Played by Gary Cooper
 The White Knight was planned to appear in Disney's 1951 movie, but the idea got scrapped. Alice had to meet him at the Tulgey Wood, where the White Knight (supposed to be a caricature of Walt Disney himself) tried to lift her spirit up after the girl gets lost. Few concept art pictures of the White Knight survive.
 Alice in Wonderland (1955) (TV) Played by Reginald Gardiner
 Alice in Wonderland (or What's a Nice Kid Like You Doing in a Place Like This?) (1966) (TV) Played by Bill Dana
 Alice Through the Looking Glass (1974) (TV) Played by Geoffrey Bayldon
 Alisa v Zazerkalie ("Alice through the Looking-Glass") (1982) (Soviet cartoon) Voiced by Nikolai Karachentsov
 Alice in Wonderland 1982 (TV) Played by Stephen Boe
 Great Performances: "Alice in Wonderland" (1983) TV episode, Played by Richard Burton
 Alice in Wonderland (1985) (TV) Played by Lloyd Bridges
 Alice Through the Looking Glass (1987) (TV) Played by Alan Young
 Chess Wars (1996) Played by Kirk B.R. Woller
 Alice Through the Looking Glass (1998) (TV) Played by Ian Holm
 Alice Underground (1999) Played by Chris Danuser
 Alice in Wonderland (1999) (TV) Played by Christopher Lloyd
 The Slick White Rabbit (2005) Played by Steve Furedy
 Alice'' (2009) (TV) Played by Matt Frewer
 In the 2010 movie, the White Knight is one of the White Queen's soldiers. He looks almost exactly like the real chess piece where he has the head of a horse.

References 

Lewis Carroll characters
Fictional knights
Literary characters introduced in 1871